Süleyman Genç (1944–2022) is a former Turkish politician and author.  He was a leading figure of the Turkish left youth movement in the 1960s, and a member of the Grand National Assembly of Turkey for the Republican People's Party (CHP) from 1973 to 1980.
He was born in Gölyayla, İkizdere. He died in Bursa on 3 November 2022.

Books
Some of his books include:
 Oniki Martá nasil gelindi (1971) - 1971 Turkish coup d'état
 Bıçağın sırtındaki Türkiye: CIA-MİT kontr-gerilla (1978) - Counter-Guerrilla
 (with Mehmet Saadettin Aygen, Süleyman Bozok) Afyonkarahisar masalları (1983)
 (with Emin Tanrıvermiş) Geniş açıklama ve muhasebe örnekleri ile Katma Değer Vergisi Kanunu (1985)
 Kuşatılan devlet, Türkiye (1997)

References

1944 births
2022 deaths
People from İkizdere
Republican People's Party (Turkey) politicians
Deputies of Izmir
Turkish male writers